Bergelmir or Saturn XXXVIII (provisional designation S/2004 S 15) is a natural satellite of Saturn. Its discovery was announced by Scott S. Sheppard, David C. Jewitt, Jan Kleyna, and Brian G. Marsden on May 4, 2005, from observations taken between December 12, 2004, and March 9, 2005.

Its rotation period is  hours.

It was named in April 2007 after Bergelmir, a giant from Norse mythology and the grandson of Ymir, the primordial giant. Bergelmir and his wife alone among their kind were the only survivors of the enormous deluge of blood from Ymir's wounds when he was killed by Odin and his brothers at the dawn of time. Bergelmir then became the progenitor of a new race of giants.

References

External links 
 Institute for Astronomy Saturn Satellite Data
 Jewitt's New Satellites of Saturn page
 IAUC 8523 – New Satellites of Saturn, Central Bureau for Astronomical Telegrams, May 4, 2005 (discovery)
 MPEC 2005-J13: Twelve New Satellites of Saturn May 3, 2005 (discovery and ephemeris)
 IAUC 8826 – Satellites of Jupiter and Saturn, Central Bureau for Astronomical Telegrams, April 5, 2007 (naming the moon)

Norse group
Moons of Saturn
Irregular satellites
Discoveries by Scott S. Sheppard
Astronomical objects discovered in 2005
Moons with a retrograde orbit